Baghdad Central Station is the main train station in Baghdad. It links the rail network to the south and the north of Iraq. The station was built by the British to designs by J. M. Wilson, a Scot who had been an assistant to Lutyens in New Delhi and who subsequently set up a practice of his own in Baghdad. Construction started in 1948 and finished in 1953. The station is the biggest one in Iraq.

History
The train station was originally built by the British and it was considered as the "Jewel of Baghdad" for daily travellers. The station offered telegraph services, it had also a bank, a post office, a saloon, shopping areas and a restaurant. The station even had an office with printing presses which are still printing the train tickets.

After the 2003 U.S.-led invasion of Iraq, thieves snatched the station's furniture, lighting fixtures and even bathroom plumbing.

Renovations
A $5.9 million renovation began in 2004 and was completed in June 2006. The renovation included all-new power plant and air conditioning system. The electrical, water, and sewer lines were replaced. The restaurant was rehabilitated and the roof, the windows and the plaster walls were replaced. All clocks were replaced and connected to one new central system. Also, the broken mosaic floor tiles were replaced.

A new entrance was constructed. Two new seven passenger elevators, new bathrooms and a hotel with 13 rooms were added along with a new fire alarm and sprinkler system

Gallery

See also
 Iraqi Republic Railways
 Railway stations in Iraq
 Baghdad Metro

References

External links
 Ministry of Transportation - General Company for Iraqi Railways
 In pictures: The crown jewel of Iraq's railway - BBC News, 28 November 2016

Transport in Baghdad
Railway stations in Iraq
Buildings and structures in Baghdad
1953 establishments in Iraq
Railway stations opened in 1953